Richard Mantell (born 17 August 1981) is an English field hockey defender. He is the older brother of Simon Mantell.

Mantell made his international debut on 10 February 2003. He was a member of the England squad that competed at the 2006 and 2010 Hockey World Cup. He was also part of the winning squad at the 2009 EuroHockey Championship and came third in 2011, and also competed in the Champions Trophy in 2007, 2009 and 2011.
Mantell has also represented Great Britain at the 2008 Summer Olympics and the 2010 Commonwealth Games.

Mantell was born in Bridgwater, Somerset, and studied at the University of Bath. He is nicknamed Rick or Ricky or Tricky. He has played club hockey for Reading.

References

External links
 

1981 births
Living people
English male field hockey players
Male field hockey defenders
People from Bridgwater
2006 Men's Hockey World Cup players
Field hockey players at the 2008 Summer Olympics
Field hockey players at the 2010 Commonwealth Games
2010 Men's Hockey World Cup players
Olympic field hockey players of Great Britain
British male field hockey players
Reading Hockey Club players
Commonwealth Games competitors for England